Titanohierax gloveralleni is an extinct hawk species known from fossils found in Cuba, Hispaniola (today the Dominican Republic and Haiti), and The Bahamas.

Description
This species was most likely an apex predator in the Antilles.

Taxonomy
The extinct crab-hawk Buteogallus borrasi was formerly placed in Titanohierax genus with T. gloveralleni.  T. gloveralleni'''s closest living relatives are the modern, still-extant species of crab-hawks in Buteogallus''.

References

External links 

Late Quaternary prehistoric birds
Extinct birds of the Caribbean
Accipitridae
Prehistoric bird genera
Extinct monotypic bird genera
†
†
Birds of the Bahamas
Extinct animals of Cuba
Extinct animals of the Dominican Republic
Extinct animals of Haiti
Birds described in 1937
Fossil taxa described in 1937
Taxa named by Alexander Wetmore